Teunissen–Cremers syndrome is a genetic disorder that presents with skeleton defects some of which can include the bones of the inner ear, fingers and toes. This can result in conductive hearing loss and finger deformities.

References

Bert Teunissen, Cor Cremers.
An autosomal dominant inherited syndrome with congenital stapes ankylosis.
Laryngoscope 100: April 1990, 380-384

External links 

Genetic diseases and disorders
Deafness
Skeletal disorders
Syndromes